The interspinous ligaments (interspinal ligaments) are thin and membranous ligaments, that connect adjoining spinous processes of the vertebra in the spine.
They extend from the root to the apex of each spinous process. They meet the ligamenta flava in front and blend with the supraspinous ligament behind.

The ligaments are narrow and elongated in the thoracic region, broader, thicker, and quadrilateral in form in the lumbar region, and only slightly developed in the neck. In the neck they are often considered part of the nuchal ligament.

The function of the interspinous ligaments is to limit flexion of the spine.

References

External links
 Interspinous ligaments on AnatomyExpert.com
 Interspinous ligament - BlueLink Anatomy - University of Michigan Medical School 

Ligaments of the torso
Bones of the vertebral column